Terminalia kumpaja is a tree of the family Combretaceae native to northern Australia.

It is found in a few isolated areas along the coast in the Kimberley and Pilbara regions of Western Australia.

References

Trees of Australia
Rosids of Western Australia
Plants described in 2015
kumpaja
Taxa named by Russell Lindsay Barrett